A foot-lambert or footlambert (fL, sometimes fl or ft-L) is a unit of luminance in United States customary units and some other unit systems. A foot-lambert equals 1/π or 0.3183 candela per square foot, or 3.426 candela per square meter (the corresponding SI unit). The foot-lambert is named after Johann Heinrich Lambert (1728–1777), a Swiss-German mathematician, physicist and astronomer. It is rarely used by electrical and lighting engineers, who prefer the candela per square foot or candela per square meter units.

The luminance of a perfect Lambertian diffuse reflecting surface in foot-lamberts is equal to the incident illuminance in foot-candles. For real diffuse reflectors, the ratio of luminance to illuminance in these units is roughly equal to the reflectance of the surface. Mathematically,
,
where
 is the luminance, in foot-lamberts,
 is the illuminance, in foot-candles, and
 is the reflectivity, expressed as a fractional number (for example, a grey card with 18% reflectivity would have ).

The foot-lambert is used in the motion picture industry for measuring the luminance of images on a projection screen. The Society of Motion Picture and Television Engineers (SMPTE) recommended, in SMPTE 196M, a screen luminance of 16 foot-lamberts for commercial movie theaters, when measured "open-gate" (i.e. with no film in the projector). (Typical base density of 0.05 yields peak white of about 14 fL.) The current revision of SMPTE 196M specifies 55 candela per square meter (nits).  

The foot-lambert is also used in the flight simulation industry to measure the highlight brightness of visual display systems. The minimum required highlight brightness varies based on the type and level of Flight Simulation Training Device (FSTD), but is generally 3–6 foot-lamberts for most devices qualified under Federal Aviation Administration (FAA) or Joint Aviation Authorities (JAA) regulations.

Military specifications for illuminated switches, panels, and displays, such as MIL-PRF-22885 and SAE AS7788, also require luminance measurements in foot-lamberts. Luminance levels can vary from hundreds of foot-lamberts for sunlight readable switch displays per MIL-PRF-22885 to only a few foot-lamberts in night conditions for panels in accordance with SAE AS7788.

See also
Other units of luminance:

 Lambert (L)
 Nit (nit)
 Stilb (sb)
 Apostilb (asb)
 Blondel (blondel)
 Skot (sk)
 Bril (bril)

References

Units of luminance
Customary units of measurement in the United States